She Said Maybe may refer to:

 "She Said Maybe", a song from the bonus CD to the album Beyond the Shrouded Horizon by musician Steve Hackett
 "She Said Maybe", a song from the album MK III by rock band Steam Powered Giraffe